Novelo is a small settlement east of Kostanjevica na Krasu in the Municipality of Miren-Kostanjevica in the Littoral region of Slovenia.

References

External links
Novelo on Geopedia

Populated places in the Municipality of Miren-Kostanjevica